The 2001 Dunedin mayoral election re-elected Sukhi Turner as Mayor of Dunedin for a third term. This was the last Dunedin mayoral election that used the First past the post method.

Results
The following table shows the results for the election:

References 

Mayoral elections in Dunedin
Dunedin
Politics of Dunedin
2000s in Dunedin